The Body in the Trunk is a 1914 American silent short drama film directed by John O' Brien starring William Garwood and George Larkin.

Cast
William Garwood
Billie West
George Larkin
George Siegmann

References

External links

1914 films
1914 drama films
Silent American drama films
American silent short films
American black-and-white films
1914 short films
Films directed by John B. O'Brien
1910s American films
1910s English-language films
American drama short films